Masroor Ali (born 15 May 1951) is a former Pakistani cricketer and umpire. He stood in one ODI game in 1986.

See also
 List of One Day International cricket umpires

References

External links

1951 births
Living people
Pakistani One Day International cricket umpires
Cricketers from Hyderabad, Sindh
Pakistani cricketers
Pakistan Universities cricketers
Sind B cricketers
Hyderabad (Pakistan) cricketers